Kangdong concentration camp (also spelled Gangdong) is a reeducation camp in North Korea. The official name of the camp is Kyo-hwa-so No. 4 (Reeducation camp no. 4).

In 1997 there used to be around 7,000 prisoners. Most of them are either soldiers or residents of Pyongyang, sentenced from 5 to 20 years. Working facilities include a cement factory, a coal mine, a limestone quarry, a glass factory and some agriculture.

Human rights situation 
According to a former prisoner, an average of 500 prisoners die annually, mostly due to waterborne illnesses. Another former prisoner reported high death rates due to work accidents, malnutrition, and disease. Seriously ill prisoners are sent home on sick leave to reduce the apparent number of deaths in detention. In the limestone quarries the prisoners have to do hard labor in hazardous conditions, with prisoners often receiving or sustaining chest ailments and lung diseases from limestone dust. Moreover, as the prisoners are rarely allowed to wash their faces, many suffer from skin abrasions and infections. Prisoners live in unsanitary conditions; they sleep on the floor in groups of 50 to 100 people, without bathing or changing their clothes. Food rations consist of only 50 g (2 oz) of corn and wheat and some cabbage soup per meal and all prisoners are seriously underweight. A former prisoner witnessed eight public executions during the eight months he was held in the camp. Rule violations are punished with reduced rations, extended sentences, and detainment in very small punishment cells. There is a criticism session every week, in which the prison officials criticize prisoners in front of a large group of prisoners.

See also 
 Human Rights in North Korea
 Kaechon concentration camp

References

External links 
 Committee for Human Rights in North Korea: The Hidden Gulag - Overview of North Korean prison camps with testimonies and satellite photographs
 Database Center for North Korean Human Rights: Prisoners in North Korea Today - Comprehensive explanation of detention facilities in North Korea based on numerous defector testimonies

Concentration camps in North Korea